Evesham may mean:

Evesham, Worcestershire, a town in Worcestershire, England
Evesham United F.C., a football club based in the Worcestershire town.
Evesham Township, New Jersey, a township in New Jersey, United States
Vale of Evesham, an area of southern Worcestershire
Evesham Technology, a computer company based in Evesham, England
 Evesham, Saint Vincent and the Grenadines, a village in Saint Vincent and the Grenadines
Evesham, the former name (e.g. in the Domesday Book) of Epsom